Sholom Secunda (Alexandria, Kherson Governorate, Russian Empire13 June 1974, New York) was an American composer of Ukrainian-Jewish descent, best known for the tunes of Bei Mir Bistu Shein and Donna Donna.

Biography

He was born in 1894 as Shloyme Abramovich Sekunda in Aleksandria city, Kherson Governorate, Russian Empire (now in Ukraine) to the family of Abram Secunda and Anna Nedobeika. In 1897 the family moved to the Black Sea port city of Mykolaiv, where they opened an iron bed factory.

At age 12 Shloyme played Abraham/Avrom in Abraham Goldfaden's Akeydes Yitskhok (The Sacrifice of Isaac) and Markus in The Kishef-Makherin (The Sorceress).

In 1907, like many other Jews of the Russian Empire (see History of the Jews in Russia), he and his family emigrated to the United States after a series of pogroms in 1905. In January 1908 the family arrived to New York as steerage passengers on board the SS Carmania and were inspected and briefly detained on Ellis Island. In New York City (they first lived on East 127th Street where his father had settled before sending for his wife and children), young Sholom became a noted child khazn (cantor). When his voice changed he studied music and taught piano, then worked in a comedy theater in the chorus until his song "Amerike" was accepted by Jennie Goldstein, who sang it  in Kornblum's Unzere kinder (Our Children).

In 1913, after studying at the Institute for Musical Arts in New York City (predecessor to the Juilliard School), he worked at the Odeon Theater as chorist and composer; 1914 saw the premier of "Yoysher, music by Sholom Secunda and Solmon Shmulevitsh." He began working in "Lyric theater" as choir director, then as director and orchestrator of the old "historic" operetta repertoire; he studied orchestration for a year under Ernest Bloch. In 1918, he became a naturalized US citizen.

In 1919-1920 he earned his first solo composer's credits with S. H. Kon's The Rabbi's Daughter and Free Slaves. He worked in Philadelphia's Metropolitan Opera House with director Boris Thomashevsky; in 1921-22 he was director and composer at Clara Young's Liberty Theater. He composed for the musical Di Yidishe Shikse by Anshl Shor (1927) and A nakht fun libe (A Night of Love) by Israel Rosenberg. An exhaustive list of his many works can be found in the Leksikon fun Yidishn Teater.

In 1932 he wrote the melody for the popular song "Bay mir bistu sheyn" on the lyrics of Jacob Jacobs for the musical performed at the Parkway Theatre in Brooklyn, which later became a major hit for the Andrews Sisters. Together with Aaron Zeitlin he wrote the famous Yiddish song "Dos kelbl (The Calf)" (also known as "Donna Donna") which was covered by many musicians, including Donovan and Joan Baez.

Along with Abraham Ellstein, Joseph Rumshinsky, and Alexander Olshanetsky, he was one of the "big four" composers of his era in New York City's Second Avenue National Theater (Yiddish theatre) scene in the Yiddish Theater District.
 Secunda also worked at another theater founded by Maurice Schwartz (an emigrant from the Russian Empire), Yiddishe Art Theater, earning $75/week for conducting an orchestra. In 1938 he gave an interview to the Courier-Post about the hit song, Bei Mir Bistu Shein.

Personal life
Secunda married the former Betty Almer, and they had two sons, Sheldon and Eugene Secunda. He died on June 13, 1974 in New York City, and was buried in Montefiore Cemetery in Springfield Gardens, Queens.

Works

Filmography 
 1930 : Sailor's Sweetheart
 1931 : A Cantor on Trial
 1939 : Kol Nidre
 1939 : Tevya
 1940 : The Jewish Melody
 1940 : Her Second Mother
 1940 : Motel the Operator
 1940 : Eli, Eli
 1950 : God, Man and Devil
 1950 : Catskill Honeymoon

Operas 
 I Would if I Could (1933), musical (associated song: Bei Mir Bistu Shein)
 Esterke (1940), musical (with the song Dos Kelbl (Donna Donna))

Autobiography 

 Sholom Secunda Tells ...

References

External links
Guide to the Sholom Secunda Papers in the Fales Library of NYU

Opera Glass
   Let be blessed his memory.
 Interview of Sholom Secunda to the Camden Courier, January 26, 1938.

1894 births
1974 deaths
People from Oleksandriia
People from Kherson Governorate
Ukrainian Jews
American male classical composers
American classical composers
American opera composers
Male opera composers
Yiddish theatre
Jewish American classical composers
Emigrants from the Russian Empire to the United States
American people of Ukrainian-Jewish descent
20th-century classical composers
20th-century American composers
20th-century American male musicians
20th-century American Jews